Saulcerīte Viese (born 2 August 1932 in Jēkabpils, died 24 December 2004 in Riga) was a Latvian writer and literary scholar. She received the Order of the Three Stars in 1995.

Works

Books
 Aspazija (1975)
 Jaunais Rainis: ieskats mazpazīstamos manuskriptos (1982)
 Krišjānis Barons, the man and his work (1985; translated to English by Tāmāra Zalīte)
 Pie sliekšn̦a, pie avota (1989)
 Gājēji uz mēnessdārzu (1990)
 Dieviena : novada eps (1994)
 Mežaparks : pilsēta priežu silā (2001)
 Mūžīgie spārni : stāstījums par Aspazijas dzīvi (2004)

References

1932 births
2004 deaths
People from Jēkabpils
Latvian writers